Aladdin – Naam Toh Suna Hoga is an Indian fantasy television series based on the Arabian Nights character Aladdin. The series premiered on 21 August 2018 on Sony SAB. The series involves Aladdin, a kind-hearted thief, as he falls in love with Princess Yasmine, befriends a wish-granting Genie of the Lamp, and battles Zafar and later the evil enchantress Mallika, and again with Sultan Aiyyar Zafar after his rebirth.

Series overview

Plot

Season 1
Mallika, an evil enchantress, tries to take over the world, but her servant Hassan betrays her and turns her into a stone statue. Before becoming a statue, Mallika turns Hassan into a genie and captures him in a lamp (chiraag).

Five hundred years later, Aladdin is born in Baghdad as the only son of ruksaar and omar, the once royal guard of Baghdad, now regarded as a traitor. Though a thief, young Aladdin is a kind-hearted, funny, brave, courageous, and hopelessly romantic poet. His biggest dream is to meet Princess Yasmine of Baghdad, with whom he fell in love at first sight (when he was seven years old). He brings a magical lamp in exchange for ten thousand gold coins for the wazir of Baghdad, Zafar but gets confined in a cave. He rubs the lamp and becomes the master of the Genie of the Lamp (Hassan), (also called Chiraag ka jinn) . He names him Ginu.

Zafar tries to steal the lamp from Aladdin but fails. Aladdin strolls freely in Baghdad's streets. Princess Yasmine is forbidden to roam in Baghdad by her mother, Queen Mallika. Still, Yasmine disguises herself, wandering around Baghdad in common clothes to address the citizens' welfare. Aladdin and Yasmine often bump into each other. Yasmine dislikes that Aladdin (Kalachor) only likes (Shehzaadi) Yasmine because of her title. As such, she introduces herself as Sana. Initially, they do not get along. Over time, they become friends and fall in love.

Zafar finds Anguthi ka Jinn aka Anguthichap aka Jhumru (Genie of Ring) in Misr. He captures Ginu, turns him into evil, and erases all of his memories of Aladdin with the help of Anguthi ke Jinn. He kills Sultan, i.e., Yasmine's father, frames Aladdin for the murder, and betrays Genie of the Ring by taking away all his powers. A heartbroken Yasmine reveals her truth to a shocked and perplexed Aladdin and sentences him to be buried alive in a short square closed room without any opening and sand-filled in it. Everyone scorns Rukhsaar as earlier her husband, and now her son, both are termed as traitors.

Season 2
One year later, Aladdin is still alive, living in Misr (Egypt). His father Omar and Bulbul Chacha saved him. In the process, Omar was killed. Aladdin finds Anguthi ka Jinn (whom he calls Anguthi Chaap)(Genie of the Ring) and discovers Zafar's crimes. Aladdin vows to seek revenge. The duo finds two more genies – an uncle and a niece duo, Genie Meanie (Genie of the Bottle) and Chand Changezi (who is called ChaCha) (Genie of the Pendant).

They take up the names Ali (Aladdin), a merchant from Ankara, his siblings Sara (Genie Meanie), Chand Changezi (ChaCha), and their servant Jhumru (Anguthi Chaap) to foil Zafar's evil intentions. Gulbadan (Aladdin's cousin) recognizes Aladdin's innocence and decides to help him. He first disguises himself as Aladdin ki rooh (Aladdin's ghost) and captures his innocence in Anguthi Chaap's ring. The plan fails when Ginu's magic changes the entire recording and Aladdin couldn't prove his innocence. Later, Yasmine finds out about Aladdin's innocence and breaks down out of guilt. Soon she realizes Ali is Aladdin disguised and confesses her love to him. Aladdin reciprocates her love. Together, they turn Ginu back to his good form, and Aladdin is reunited with his mother.

Zafar intends to reach Mallika, the evil enchantress, with the Sonminar's help. He wants to rule the entire world, but Aladdin stops him. Zafar, with the help of his sister, Zeher, finds out Ali and Ginu's truth. Aladdin and his group consisted of Yasmine, Rukhsaar, Gulbadan, Ginu, Anguthi Chaap, Genie Meanie, and Chand Changezi (the Toli), bring Zafar's offenses in front of Baghdad. Zafar dies, and Zeher escapes from Baghdad. Before his death, Zafar revived Mallika with the help of Magical Mercury (Jaadui Para). Aladdin and his companions buried Zafar's body.

A month later

On the occasion of Jashn-e-Dilbar, Aladdin proposes marriage to Yasmine, and they plan their engagement. A disguised Mallika arrives and plans for destruction by using Shaitaan ka Khanjar (Dagger of the Devil). She turns Aladdin's mother into a genie with a bracelet and persuades Aladdin to bring the three parts of the Shaitaan ka Khanjar. In a fight with Zafar's sister Zeher, Aladdin unknowingly opens a prison from which a lookalike of Zafar comes out and helps Aladdin. He introduces himself as Faraz, Zafar and Zeher's younger brother, who was imprisoned by the brother-sister duo for about 10 years. Together they collect all three parts of Shaitaan ka Khanjar by which Aladdin kills Mallika, and his mother is brought back to human form.

Faraz is revealed to be Zafar, who returned to take revenge on Aladdin and Zeher, killing the real Faraz. Using the khanjar, which is now very powerful because of Mallika's blood, Zafar becomes Aiyyar Zafar (Devil's true friend). Aladdin and Yasmine decide to go to Hell to save Omar, now an angel from punishment because he had given Aladdin a piece of the khanjar. After they reach Hell, they give the Lal Sanduk (Red Box) to Zafar, which he wants, and in return, he frees Omar from punishment. Aladdin tells Omar that the real Lal Sanduk is with them, not with Zafar. Omar sends the real Sanduk to a safer place. Omar, knowing Aladdin and Yasmine can bring the Sanduk, pushes them into lava, killing them, so the Sanduk cannot be brought back. Then he jumps into the lava to punish himself. Zafar uses a spell that erases Aladdin and Yasmine's memories from the minds of Baghdad's citizens, and he becomes the Sultan. He traps Ginu in his lamp, throws him away, and makes Anguthi Chaap his servant. Chacha and Geanie Meanie die in the world of Genie. Aladdin and Yasmine are reborn in Turkistan.

Season 3
18-years-later, Aladdin is shown as the spoilt, lazy prince of Turkistan and Yasmine as a kind-hearted, ordinary thief. After Aladdin manages to catch her, they are banished from Turkistan and reach Baghdad after finding Ginu (Anguthi Chaap guides them.) They start taking lessons from Rukhsaar, the principal of Baghdad's school (Badi Ustaad). All four have no memory of their past life. Gradually, Aladdin regains his memory of his previous life.

Aladdin tricks Zafar to make him reveal where he has kept the memories and makes Zafar turn against Zeher. As time passes, Aladdin falls for Yasmine and always speaks about her, for which Ginu and Anguthi Chaap tease him. Aladdin is shocked that Yasmine was the Sultana of Baghdad. When he saves her, he realizes Yasmine is his one true love.

Aladdin tells Yasmine about Zafar and his wicked plans. He brings Zarina, a scorpion, to finish Zafar's powers and restore Baghdad's citizens' memories once and for all. Zarina stings Zafar, and all the memories he had taken away are restored while she gets killed. Aladdin is reunited with his mother Rukhsaar, his brothers Anguthi Chaap and Ginu, and his love Yasmine. After many hurdles, Zafar and Zeher are captured and jailed. Yasmine is proclaimed Sultana-e-Baghdad while Zafar and Zeher plot against Rukhsaar. Zafar and Zeher manage to escape. Later, Yasmine confesses her love to Aladdin, and both get engaged. Zafar performs a ritual and tells them a meteoroid will soon crash on Earth, and the Black Lamp (Kala Chiraag), which is present in the Lal Sanduk, can only stop that. Aladdin, Yasmine, and Zafar travel to Marakkesh to get the lamp. After a series of incidents, Zafar takes over the Black Lamp (Kala Chiraag) and its genie and becomes the master of the Black Genie (Kala Jinn). On the other side, Zeher makes Anguthi Chaap her slave, but he sacrifices himself.

Anguthi Chaap, before his death, tells Rukhsaar that Zafar can't be killed. He locked his soul in a locket hidden in Hell. Anguthi Chaap helps her to get there, and Rukhsaar gets the locket. She goes to Marakkesh to kill Zafar. Rukhsaar frees the soul from the locket, and Aladdin kills him. The Black Genie gets captured in his lamp again. He vows to escape to take revenge for his Master's death. Everything in Baghdad is well, and Aladdin and Yasmine get married. Anguthi Chaap's soul happily looks over them. But someone releases the Black Genie, and Ginu senses danger. The series ends with Aladdin and Yasmine ready to fight the evils of the world once again.

Cast

Main                                                                                                                                                                                                                                                                                                                                                                                                                                                                                                                                                                                                                                                                                                                                                                                                                                                                                                                                                                                                                                                                                                                                                                                                                                                                                                                                                                                                                                                                                                                                                                                                                                                                                                                                                                                                                                                                                                                                                                                                                                                                                                                                                                                                                  
 Siddharth Nigam as Aladdin, Ali, and Haider (Aladdin's evil duplicate) - Rukhsaar and Omar's son. A kind-hearted and smart, handsome young boy, widely known in Baghdad as Kala Chor (Black Thief).Master of the Genie of the Lamp (Ginu), Genie of the Ring (Anguthi Chaap), Genie of the Bottle (Geanie Meanie), and Genie of the Pendant (Chand Changezi). Former love interest of Piddi, Shehzadi Meher, Sultana Adaaya and Zohra Begum. After the leap, Prince of Turkistan. Yasmine's love interest turned-husband . (2018–2021)
 Avneet Kaur (2018 - 2020)/Ashi Singh (2020–2021) as Yasmine a.k.a. Sultana-e-Baghdad, Sultana Yasmine (formerly Princess Yasmine) - Sultan Shahnawaz and Mehrunissa's daughter. A courageous and beautiful young woman who roamed Baghdad assuring the welfare of her citizens. After leap, an orphan. Aladdin's love interest turned-wife .
 Aamir Dalvi as Zafar, the former Grand Vizier and the Sultan of Baghdad after Aladdin and Yasmine's deaths. He is a greedy man who plans to take over the world. He is also known as Muchhad and is responsible for all the troubles in Baghdad. He becomes the master of Ginu and Anguthichap also ginie minie and chand chagezi before aladin re-erns the.He is also the brother of Zeher. He became the master of the Kala Jinn but still met his demise at the reborn Aladdin's hands. (2018–2021)
Raashul Tandon as Hassan-Ul-Rahman-Bin-Tughluq/Ginu – Genie of the Lamp, a genie whom Aladdin considers a brother and calls Ginu and younger brother of the Genie of the Ring, Anguthi Chaap. Love interest of Genie Meanie (2018–2021)
 Smita Bansal as Rukhsaar – Aladdin's mother before rebirth, a kind-hearted woman who never held grudges even to those who are cruel around her. (2018–2021)
 Praneet Bhat as Anguthi Chaap – Genie of the Ring, a genie found in Misr by Zafar. He is also the elder brother of Ginu and the wisest of all genies. (2019–2021)
 Gireesh Sahdev as Omar, Aladdin's father before rebirth. (2018–2020)

Recurring 
 Nausheen Ali Sardar / Debina Bonnerjee as the evil enchantress Mallika who was turned into stone by Hassan (Ginu). She made the lamp of Ginu and Anguthi Chaap's ring. She arose after 500 years and came to Baghdad to become the most powerful in the World using the Devil's Dagger. Though, Aladdin kills her using the Devil's Dagger in a fight. (2018–2020)
 Divyangana Jain as Sultana-e-Baltish, also known as Zeher-un-Nissa – Zafar's sister, a powerful toxicologist who could make any dangerous venom and who helped Zafar to reveal all the truth of Aladdin and his Gins and also helped Zafar to get the Devil's Dagger deceptively from Aladdin to become the most powerful in the World. She accidentally died due to her own poison being thrown at herself when throwing it on Aladdin. (2019–2021)
Sonal Kaushal as the voice of Shaheen, Kali Chorni Yasmine's talking parrot and best friend. She considers Yasmine as a sister. She has a unique sense of humor and a unique style of talking. She talks a lot, thus gaining the nickname, "Chatar-Patar". (2020–2021)
 Amit Raghuvanshi as Sheefan, Koyal's brother, is one of the best students of Rukhsaar but he is jealous of Shehzada Aladdin and Jinu and creates problems for them though he likes Yasmine very much and always advises her to stay away from Aladdin. (2020)
 Vikas Grover as Gulbadan, the former Grand Vizier of Baghdad and Aladdin's cousin, an innocent and kind-hearted person who helped Aladdin to save Baghdad. (2018–2020)
 Sonal Bhojwani as Geanie-Meanie/Sarah, Genie of the Bottle, a mermaid-shaped genie, and Ginu's love interest. She has the ability to freeze time for 30 seconds. She went to the genie world in order to pray for Aladdin and Yasmine, but died as her master Aladdin dies along with her Magical Bottle at the end of season 2. (2019–2020)
 Krishang Bhanushali as Chand Changezi, Genie of the Pendant a 1,500-year-old genie but was able to take the form of a seven-year-old child and could transform into any object. He was also nicknamed Chacha by all. Along with Geanie-Meanie, he also went to the Genie world to pray for Aladdin and Yasmine but died as his master Aladdin dies along with his Magical Pendant at the end of season 2. (2019–2020)
 Gulfam Khan as Nazneen Begum – Gulbadan's mother, Mustafa's wife, Aladdin's aunt, and a greedy woman who always collaborates with the evil person whether Zafar or Mallika. She is now a cook in the Shahi Talimghar but also a small thief along with Mustafa Chacha in Season 3. (2018–2020)
 Badrul Islam as Mustafa Chacha – Gulbadan's father, Aladdin's uncle, Omar's younger brother, and a comical person who always works with Nazneen in her selfish motives. He is now a cook in Talimghar but also a small thief along with Nazneen Begum in Season 3. (2018–2020)
 Nithish as Prince Anders, a courageous and handsome young Prince from Skanland. He was a potential husband for Princess Yasmine. (2019)
 Chayan Trivedi as Bulbul Chacha, Aladdin's uncle, Omar, and Mustafa's cousin, Chulbul's grandfather. He helps Aladdin with his various tasks by giving him his new inventions. He was killed by Zafar. (2018–2020)
 Soni Singh as Zarina, a shapeshifter, kind-hearted, orphan female scorpion whom Shehzada Aladdin considered a sister. She fell in love with Zafar but gets stabbed by him. As she was coming close to her death, she remembered her promise which she had given to her brother Aladdin. To fulfill that promise, she stings Zafar which leads to the removal of all dark powers from Zafar, thus freeing the memories of Baghdad's citizens. (2020)
 Gyan Prakash as Sultan Shahnawaz, the Sultan (King) of Baghdad, Yasmine's father. He is killed by Zafar. And as Jhuman, polymorphism of sultan Shahnawaz. (2018–2019)
 Farhina Parvez as Piddi, Yasmine's loyal handmaiden and friend. She often comforted Yasmine whenever she was upset. (2018–2019)
 Yashu Dhiman as Mallika Begum Mehrunisa, the former Queen of Baghdad, Yasmine's mother. She helped Yasmine to take care of the people of Baghdad. (2018–2019)
 Prakhar Saxena as Subedar Akbar, Zafar's former right hand. (2018–2020)
 Tushar Kawale as Badal, Zafar's brother-in-law. Zafar threw him off a cliff for failing to claim the lamp. (2018)
 Ritu Singh as Bijli, Zafar's sister-in-law. Zafar threw her off a cliff for failing to claim the lamp. (2018)
 Chahat Pandey as Meher, a princess of Yemen and cousin of Yasmine. She had a crush on Aladdin, making Yasmine jealous. (2019)
 Shrashti Maheshwari as Gulegulfam, Gulbadan's haughty wife who went to her mom's house. (2019)
 Vinit Kakar as Haiwan-e-Hiblish, the wicked demon who contaminated the water using his toxic venom. (2019)
 Pal John as Sultana-e-Misr, Sultana Adaya, a stubborn young sultana regnant and Aladdin's former fiancée. She helped Aladdin by giving Atish-e-Aftab. (2019)
 Shivani Badoni as Koyal, another student of Rukhsaar and the sister of Sheefan. She likes Aladdin very much and genuinely cares for everyone. (2020)
 Karan Khan as Chulbul, grandson of Bulbul Chacha and an inventor of scientific things like his grandfather, an aid to Rukhsar and Aladdin. (2020–2021)
 Jogesh as Khalibali, a therian guard. He guards the Talimghar according to Zafar. (2020–2021)
 Harsh Vashisht as Sultan-e-Turkistan, Sultan Firoz – prince Aladdin's father after rebirth, a dutiful and fair Sultan, and a strict father who wants to help Prince Aladdin find the right path. He also gives prince Aladdin the responsibility to catch the Kali Chorni. (2020)
 Guneet Sharma as Shiraz, Aladdin's close friend. (2020)
 Vipul Tyagi as Faiz, a sidekick of Prince Aladdin who helps him in his mischief. (2020)
 Aradhana Sharma as Sultana-e-Aqaba, Sultana Tamanna, a mysterious sultana regnant who is a cat-woman and also knows magic. She was given the duty by Omar to guard the Devil's Dagger's second part but Aladdin somehow took it with him. (2020)
 Kajal Jain as Mehjabeen, a witch, who was Zafar's ex-fiancé, that came out due to a task given by Rukhsaar to Shehzaada Aladdin and his team to take the magic lantern to get prepared for the Zafar's task. She was killed by zeher (2020)
 Viren Singh Rathore as Allah Rakha, Omar's friend and a protector of truth who is approached by Rukhsaar to get help for Aladdin and other children of Talimghar from Zafar. He fights with Zafar but gets killed due to Zeher's poison. (2020)
 Unknown as Akkubara, guardian of Earth. She helped Aladdin to reach Allah Rakha after testing his qualities. (2020)
 Unknown as Sunahari, a little girl rescued by Yasmine from the gang of Zafar. Now, she resides along with Yasmine in the Talimghar. (2020)
 Om Aditya Yadav as young Aladdin who saw Princess Yasmine in her childhood and fell for her. (2018)
 Anila K Kharbanda as Roothi, Riddhi Gupta as Jhoothi, and Prerika Arora as Tooti are all fairies who helped Zafar watch the past of Prince Aladdin and Yasmin. (2020)
 Shweta Khanduri as Aliza, a manipulative harridan killed by Ginu. (2018)
 Milan Singh as Zehreeli, a naagin (a shape-shifter female serpent) who has the power of seeing the future. (2020–2021)
 Nirisha Basnett as Sheher-zaadi, a powerful authoress and an aid to Zafar. She is the daughter of the Kala Jinn from the Kala Chirag that Zafar wanted. She was able to trap people in her dark story and was able to create new characters in her story which happened in reality. She was trapped by Aladdin in her own story. (2021)

Guest appearances
From Baalveer Returns (2020):

 Priya Sharma as Nagini, the queen of snakes and venom, created by Bhaymar.
 Dev Joshi as Senior Baalveer, the savior of the world from the future.
 Aditya Ranvijay as Bhaymar, the commander of Kaal Lok from the future.
 Vansh Sayani as Vivaan, Junior Baalveer from the future. 
 Pavitra Punia as Timnasa, the evil queen of Kaal Lok from the future.
Ahmad Harhash as Runo the evil of the Timnasa kaal Lok from the future

Crossover
Aladdin – Naam Toh Suna Hoga did a Crossover with the series Baalveer Returns for 5 episodes from 27 January 2020 to 31 January 2020.

Awards

References

External links
 
 Aladdin Naam Toh Suna Hoga on SonyLIV

2010s Indian television series
2020s Indian television series
2018 Indian television series debuts
2021 Indian television series endings
Genies in television
Hindi-language television shows
Indian fantasy television series
Sony SAB original programming
Works based on Aladdin